Heteranthoecia is a genus of African plants in the grass family. The only known species is Heteranthoecia guineensis, which is widespread across much of tropical Africa from Senegal to Tanzania and Angola.

References

Micrairoideae
Grasses of Africa
Monotypic Poaceae genera